Benelux' Next Top Model, Season 2 was the second and last season of Benelux' Next Top Model which include Dutch and Flemish contestants. It premiered on September 13 and was aired until November 16, 2010. Although castings for a third season of the show were announced, the show returned as Holland's Next Top Model, the title it had prior the merge with the Belgian Topmodel version of the show.

The winner of the competition was 18-year-old Melissa Baas from IJsselstein. Not only was she the second girl from the Netherlands to win the competition; the entire top three (Baas, Renée Trompert and Alix Schoonheijt) were from this country.

Contestants
(ages stated are at start of contest)

Summaries

Call-out order

 The contestant was eliminated
 The contestant was immune from elimination
 The contestant won the competition

Photo shoot guide
Episode 1 photo shoot: Body painting promo photos
Episode 2 photo shoot: Circus
Episode 3 photo shoot: Oil of Olaz 
Episode 4 photo shoot: Meat packing industry
Episode 5 photo shoot: Gold body painting with sunglasses
Episode 6 photo shoot: Icy in bikinis
Episode 7 photo shoot: Posing underwater
Episode 8 photo shoot: Bruno Banani perfume

Judges
Daphne Deckers (Host)
Geert De Wolf
Bastiaan van Schaik
Mariana Verkerk
Jani Kazaltzis

Other cast members
 Marie-Sophie Steenaert - Make-up Artist
 Mariëlle Bastiaansen  - Hair Stylist

Special guests
Heidi Klum (Episode 1)

References

External links
Official 2BE website
Official RTL5 website

Top Model